The Rice-Marler House, in Decatur, Tennessee, was built in 1856.  It was listed on the National Register of Historic Places in 1982.

It is a two-story frame house built upon a stone pier foundation, with a one-story rear ell.  Its weatherboard exterior is covered with aluminum siding.

The site includes foundation ruins of a slave cabin.

The house is unusual as one of few I-houses in Meigs County, Tennessee which has a five-bay facade and gable end chimneys.  It is also unusual for having graining on its interior doors and marbling on its mantlepieces.

References

I-houses in Tennessee
National Register of Historic Places in Meigs County, Tennessee
Houses completed in 1856
Slave cabins and quarters in the United States